The 2008 All American Football League Draft took place in Atlanta, Georgia on January 26, 2008. It was used to stock the six teams that were to play the league's 2008 season, which was ultimately canceled. The draft was effectively voided when the league announced it would pick new host markets for its inaugural season, which was scheduled for spring 2011.

Draft rules

Time allowed
For rounds 1 and 2, each team is allowed 4 minutes per selection. For rounds 3 and 4, each team is allowed 3 minutes per selection. For round 5, each team is allowed 2 minutes per selection.

Draft order
In odd-numbered rounds (1, 3, 5, 7, 9, 11 and 13), teams will go by in the regular draft order. For even-numbered rounds (2, 4, 6, 8, 10 and 12), teams will go by the reverse order of the odd-numbered rounds.

Draft eligibility
 Players must have attended a combine, workout or tryout, or player must have a written scouting report from an AAFL coach or League personnel on file at the League office.
 Player must have signed an AAFL Draft Eligible Player Agreement.
 Player must have verification of a college degree (official transcript) on file at the League office.

"Protected" players
Each team was permitted to designate a number of "protected" players from schools within their area.  These players counted towards the middle rounds of the 50-round draft.

The draft

Round 1

Round 2

Round 3

Round 4

Round 5

Round 6

Round 7

Round 8

Round 9

Round 10

Round 11

Round 12

Round 13

Round 14

References

All American Football League
AAFL
AAFL Draft
AAFL Draft
AAFL Draft
American football in Atlanta
Events in Atlanta